2013 was designated as:
International Year of Water Cooperation
International Year of Quinoa

Events

January
 January 5 – 2013 Craig, Alaska earthquake: A  ('Moderate') earthquake shakes Prince of Wales Island.
 January 10 – At least 130 people are killed and 270 are injured in several bomb blasts in Pakistan.
 January 11 – The French military begins a 5-month intervention into the Northern Mali conflict, targeting the militant Islamist Ansar Dine group.
 January 16–20 – Thirty-nine international workers and 1 security guard die in a hostage crisis at a natural gas facility near In Aménas, Algeria.
 January 21 – Barack Obama is sworn in for a second term as President of the United States.
 January 27 – An estimated 245 people die in a nightclub fire in Santa Maria, Rio Grande do Sul, Brazil.

February
 February 12 – North Korea conducts its third underground nuclear test, prompting widespread condemnation and tightened economic sanctions from the international community.
 February 15 – A meteor explodes over the Russian city of Chelyabinsk, injuring 1,489–1,492 people and damaging over 4,300 buildings. It is the most powerful meteor to strike Earth's atmosphere in over a century. The incident, along with a coincidental flyby of a larger asteroid, prompts international concern regarding the vulnerability of the planet to meteor strikes.
 February 21 – American scientists use a 3D printer to create a living lab-grown ear from collagen and animal ear cell cultures. In the future, it is hoped that similar ears could be grown to order as transplants for human patients with ear trauma or amputation.
 February 25 – Park Geun-hye becomes the first woman to become the president of South Korea.
 February 28 – Benedict XVI resigns as pope, becoming the first to do so since Gregory XII in 1415, and the first to do so voluntarily since Celestine V in 1294.

March
 March 13 – Cardinal Jorge Mario Bergoglio of Argentina is elected the 266th pope, whereupon he takes the name Francis and becomes the first Jesuit pope, the first pope from the Americas, and the first pope from the Southern Hemisphere.
 March 24 – Central African Republic President François Bozizé flees to the Democratic Republic of the Congo, after rebel forces capture the nation's capital, Bangui.
 March 25 – The European Union agrees to a €10 billion economic bailout for Cyprus. The bailout loan will be equally split between the European Financial Stabilisation Mechanism, the European Financial Stability Facility, and the International Monetary Fund. The deal precipitates a banking crisis in the island nation.

April
 April 2 – The United Nations General Assembly adopts the Arms Trade Treaty to regulate the international trade of conventional weapons.
April 13 – Venezuelan presidential election: Nicolás Maduro is declared winner with a narrow victory over his opponent Henrique Capriles Radonski. Protests continue to October.
 April 15 – Boston Marathon bombing: Two Chechnya-born Islamist brothers (one a United States citizen) detonate 2 bombs at the Boston Marathon in Boston, Massachusetts, in the United States, killing 3 and injuring 264 others.
April 20 – A magnitude 6.6 earthquake jolts Sichuan, China, leaving 193 people dead and more than 11,000 injured.
April 21 – Businessman Horacio Cartes wins the 2013 Paraguayan general election against Efraín Alegre.
 April 24 – The 2013 Savar building collapse, one of the worst industrial disasters in the world, kills 1,134 people in Bangladesh.
 April 30 – Willem-Alexander is inaugurated as King of the Netherlands following the abdication of Beatrix.

May

 May 14–18 – The Eurovision Song Contest 2013 takes place in Malmö, Sweden, and is won by Danish entrant Emmelie de Forest with the song "Only Teardrops".
 May 15
Researchers from Oregon Health & Science University in the United States describe the first production of human embryonic stem cells by cloning, in a study published in the scientific journal Nature.
The World Health Organization names the novel coronavirus Middle East respiratory syndrome (MERS).
 May 22 – Off-duty British Army soldier Fusilier Lee Rigby of the Royal Regiment of Fusiliers is murdered in Woolwich, southeast London, by Islamic terrorists Michael Adebolajo and Michael Adebowale.
 May 31 – The largest tornado ever recorded hit El Reno. This rain-wrapped, multiple-vortex tornado was the widest tornado ever recorded. Remaining over mostly open terrain, the tornado did not impact many structures; however, measurements from mobile weather radars revealed extreme winds up to 296 mph (476 km/h) within the vortex. These are among the highest observed wind speeds on Earth, just slightly lower than the wind speeds of 1999 Bridge Creek–Moore tornado. As it crossed U.S. 81, it had grown to a record-breaking width of 2.6 miles (4.2 km).

June
 June 6 – Former CIA employee Edward Snowden discloses operations engaged in by a U.S. government mass surveillance program to news publications and flees the country, later being granted temporary asylum in Russia.
 June 25 – Emir of Qatar Hamad bin Khalifa Al Thani abdicates and his son Tamim bin Hamad Al Thani assumes power.
 June 26
 Kevin Rudd defeats Julia Gillard in an Australian Labor Party leadership ballot and consequently becomes Prime Minister of Australia, three years after Gillard replaced Rudd.
 United States v. Windsor (570 U.S. 744) decided in the Supreme Court of the United States, overturning a key section of the Defense of Marriage Act and hence granting federal recognition to same-sex marriage in the United States.

July
 July 1 – Croatia becomes the 28th member of the European Union.
 July 3 – Amid mass protests across Egypt, President Mohamed Morsi is deposed in a military coup d'état, leading to widespread violence.
 July 21 – Philippe is sworn in as King of the Belgians, following the abdication of Albert II.
 July 22–28 – XIV World Youth Day, in Rio de Janeiro, Brazil.

August
 August 14 – Following the military coup in Egypt, two anti-coup camps are raided by the security forces, leaving 2,696 dead. The raids were described by Human Rights Watch as "one of the world's largest killings of demonstrators in a single day in recent history".
August 15 – Horacio Cartes is sworn in as President of Paraguay.
 August 21 – 1,429 are killed in the Ghouta chemical attack during the Syrian Civil War.
 August 29 – The United Kingdom Parliament votes against UK military attacks on Syria.

September
 September 7 
 2013 Australian federal election: The Liberal/National Coalition led by Tony Abbott defeats the Labor Government led by Prime Minister Kevin Rudd. Abbott would be sworn in on September 18th.
 The International Olympic Committee awards Tokyo the right to host the 2020 Summer Olympics.
 September 8 – The 2013 Colorado Floods begin, resulting from heavy rain in the Colorado River Basin.
 September 17 – Rockstar Games releases video game Grand Theft Auto V.
 September 21 – al-Shabaab militants attack the Westgate shopping mall in Nairobi, Kenya, killing at least 62 civilians and wounding over 170.

October
 October 10 – Delegates from some 140 countries and territories sign the Minamata Treaty, a UNEP treaty designed to protect human health and the environment from emissions and releases of mercury and mercury compounds.
 October 15 – A magnitude 7.2 earthquake struck Bohol, Philippines, leaving 222 dead, 8 missing, and 976 people injured.
 October 18 – Saudi Arabia rejects a seat on the United Nations Security Council, making it the first country to reject a seat on the Security Council. Jordan takes the seat on December 6.

November
 November 5 – The uncrewed Mars Orbiter Mission is launched by India from its launch pad in Sriharikota.
 November 8 – Typhoon Haiyan (Yolanda), one of the strongest tropical cyclones on record, hits the Philippines and Vietnam, causing devastation with at least 6,241 dead.
 November 12 – Three Studies of Lucian Freud, a series of portraits of Lucian Freud by the British painter Francis Bacon, sells for US$142.4 million in a New York City auction, setting a world record for an auctioned work of art.
 November 17 – Fifty people are killed when Tatarstan Airlines Flight 363 crashes at Kazan Airport, Russia.
 November 21 
 Euromaidan pro-EU demonstrations begin in Ukraine after President Viktor Yanukovych rejects an economic association agreement between the European Union and Ukraine in favor of closer ties to Russia.
 Moldovan-flagged cargo ship  makes port in Beirut, Lebanon, carrying 2,750 tonnes of ammonium nitrate. After inspection by port state control, the Rhosus is deemed unseaworthy, and is forbidden to set sail. By order of an Urgent Matters judge in Beirut, the cargo is brought ashore in 2014 and placed in Warehouse 12 at the port, where it will remain for six years. The ammonium nitrate will erupt in a massive explosion on August 4, 2020.
 November 24 – Iran agrees to limit their nuclear development program in exchange for sanctions relief.

December
 December 7 – Ninth Ministerial Conference of the World Trade Organization delegates sign the Bali Package agreement aimed at loosening global trade barriers.
 December 14 – Chinese uncrewed spacecraft Chang'e 3, carrying the Yutu rover, becomes the first spacecraft to "soft"-land on the Moon since 1976 and the third ever robotic rover to do so.
 December 15 – Fighting between ethnic Dinka and Nuer members of the presidential guard break out in Juba, South Sudan, plunging the country into civil war.

Births and Deaths

Nobel Prizes

 Chemistry – Martin Karplus, Michael Levitt, and Arieh Warshel
 Economics – Eugene Fama, Lars Peter Hansen and Robert J. Shiller
 Literature – Alice Munro
 Peace – Organisation for the Prohibition of Chemical Weapons
 Physics – François Englert and Peter Higgs
 Physiology or Medicine – James E. Rothman, Randy W. Schekman, and Thomas C. Südhof

New English words
bingeable

See also
 List of international years

References